William Angus Dickson (9 February 1882 – 25 July 1967) was a Canadian politician. He was a Liberal member of the Legislative Assembly of Ontario from 1934 to 1945 who represented the riding of Perth.

Background
Dickson was a farmer in Elma Township. He is related to Thomas Ballantyne, and great-grandfather of Jane Philpott.

Politics
Dickson was reeve of Elma Township. In 1934, he ran as the Liberal candidate in the riding of Perth County.

References

External links
 

1882 births
1967 deaths
Ontario Liberal Party MPPs
People from Perth County, Ontario